Herman Arthur Hedderick (January 1, 1930 – August 20, 2014) was an American professional basketball player. Hedderick was selected in the 1952 NBA draft by the Boston Celtics after a collegiate career at Canisius. He played for the New York Knicks in only five games during the second half of the 1954–55 season. His career totals include four points, four rebounds and two assists.

References

External links
 Canisius Hall of Fame entry

1930 births
2014 deaths
American men's basketball players
Baseball pitchers
Basketball players from Pennsylvania
Boston Celtics draft picks
Canisius Golden Griffins baseball players
Canisius Golden Griffins men's basketball players
New York Knicks players
Shooting guards
Sportspeople from Erie, Pennsylvania